The South African Breweries Regional League is the fourth tier of domestic football in the South African football pyramid. There are 832 clubs competing in the competition. Most teams are made up of players under the age of 19.

In March 2023, the owner of North-West team Luka Ball Controllers was taken in for police questioning after allegedly paying R1000 each to five junior players from Swartruggens FC, their next opponents, to not attend the match, with the intention of winning by walkover. SAFA stated that they would convene a disciplinary hearing.

Sub-Leagues

The competition is split into 52 sub divisions.

References

4